Nexus is an album by American jazz pianist Gene Harris recorded in 1975 and released on the Blue Note label.

Reception
The Allmusic review awarded the album 3½ stars.

Track listing
 "Sauda" (Ronaldo N. Jackson, Charlotte Politte, John Rowin) - 2:05 
 "Funky Business" (Jackson, Politte, Rowin, Jerry Peters) - 4:05 
 "Koko and Leeroe" (Peters) - 6:05 
 "Love Don't Love Nobody" (Joseph Jefferson, Charles Simmons) - 7:28 
 "Rushin' Roulette" (C. Davis, Sigidi Abdullah, Brenda Sutton) - 3:52 
 "The Jitterbug Waltz" (Fats Waller) - 5:34 
 "Gettin' Down Country" (Peters) - 4:00 
 "H.R.D. (Boogie)" (Rowin) - 5:08 
 "Prayer '76" (Mbaji, Sigidi, Harold Clayton, Brenda Sutton, Jerry Peters) - 5:34 
Recorded at Music Recorders in Los Angeles, California in May–June, 1975.

Personnel
Gene Harris - keyboards
Al Aarons - trumpet
George Bohanon - trombone
Mike Altschul, Fred Jackson, Jr. - reeds
Julius Buffum, Wint Garvey, Rewit Koven, Charles Veal - strings
Lee Ritenour - guitar
John Rowin - guitar, electric bass
Chuck Rainey - electric bass
Kenneth Rice - drums
Ronaldo N. Jackson, Gerald Steinholtz - percussion
Harold Clayton, John Lehman, Lynn Mack, Jerry Peters, Sigidi - vocals, backing vocals
Lani Graves, Keg Johnson, Julia Tillman Waters, Maxine Willard Waters - backing vocals

References

Blue Note Records albums
Gene Harris albums
1975 albums
Albums produced by Jerry Peters